National is an extinct town in Humboldt County, in the U.S. state of Nevada.

History
There are at least two stories about why the place is named "National".  The W.P.A. states that the original town site was within the borders of Humboldt National Forest, hence the name.  Paher and Carlson state that the name came from the National brand automobile that was driven by  J. L. Workman who discovered the mining district in 1907.

A post office was established at National in 1908, and remained in operation until 1919.

In 1911–1912, addition to a post office, National had a two-story hotel, stores, saloons, a weekly newspaper (The Miner), a dentist and a doctor.

By 1915, the town was greatly diminished.

References

Ghost towns in Humboldt County, Nevada